Teddy is a Snapdragon Productions musical with music by Dougal Irvine and book by Tristan Bernays, set in the Elephant and Castle in London in 1956.

Synopsis
The story follows two teenagers, Teddy and Josie, on a Saturday night in Elephant and Castle. They are both rebellious followers of the post-war Teddy Boy sub-culture. Teddy and Josie get to know each other sharing their love for Rock and Roll.

Music
Original songs written for the show and a handful of original 1950s songs are performed by the on stage band Johnny Valentine and the Broken Hearts.

Productions
 Watermill Theatre and UK Tour, 2018
 Southwark Playhouse, 2015

Awards
In 2016, Teddy won Best New Musical and Best Lighting Designer at the Off West End Awards.

References

External links

2015 musicals
British musicals